Australian Christian College is an independent non-denominational Christian co-educational primary and secondary day school, located in the north-western Sydney suburb of Marsden Park, New South Wales, Australia. The school caters for students ranging from Year K to Year 12. Year 12 students are able to complete their Higher School Certificate at the school.

Australian Christian College – Marsden Park is one of nine Australian Christian Colleges located in Australia.

Overview
The school's vision is to develop students who are equipped spiritually, academically, socially and physically to be a positive influence on the world.

The school is owned and operated by Christian Education Ministries Ltd and is a member of Christian Schools Australia and the Association of Independent Schools of New South Wales.

Ex-principal Paulle Kwok assisted in establishing the school in 2007. It has grown to approximately 830 students. In 2011, the school celebrated its first graduation of a Year 12 HSC class.

Most students that attend the school reside in Elara, Marsden Park, Riverstone, The Ponds, Kalina, Stanhope Gardens, Schofields, Quaker’s Hill, Plumpton, Kellyville, Kings Park, Oakhurst, Castle Hill, Parklea, Glenwood, Doonside, Glenndenning, Hassel Grove, Bella Vista, Rouse Hill, Annagrove, Blacktown and Beaumont Hills. In addition, the school offers distance education to students who reside across New South Wales.

Enrolment is open to Christian students of all denominations as well as non-Christian students.

During 2011, the school opened a new A$3 million multi-purpose centre (MPC) funded by the Australian Government's Building the Education Revolution scheme. The MPC includes an indoor sports arena, canteen and classrooms.

See also

List of non-government schools in New South Wales

References

External links 
 

Marsden Park
Educational institutions established in 2007
Private primary schools in Sydney
Private secondary schools in Sydney
2007 establishments in Australia
Nondenominational Christian schools in Sydney